Bay tree can refer to:

 Bay laurel (Laurus nobilis), a tree in the family Lauraceae native to Europe
 Sweet bay tree (Magnolia virginiana), a tree in the family Magnoliaceae native to southeastern North America
 West Indian bay tree (Pimenta racemosa), a tree in the family Myrtaceae native to the Caribbean
 California bay laurel (Umbellularia), a tree in the family Lauraceae native to western North America
 Bay Tree, Alberta
 Bay Tree (Fabergé egg)

And sometimes confused with 
Prunus laurocerasus

See also
 Baywood (disambiguation)